Carl Dwayne Norris (born January 8, 1970) is a Canadian former professional ice hockey player. He played briefly in the National Hockey League (NHL) in the 1990s with the Quebec Nordiques and the Mighty Ducks of Anaheim. He was a member of Canada's silver medal-winning team at the 1994 Lillehammer Winter Olympics.

Playing career 

Norris started his hockey career with the St. John's Capitals (Caps) of the Avalon Junior Hockey League, eventually leaving home at the young age of 14 to play with the Notre Dame Hounds. He then went on to play college hockey with Michigan State. From there Norris joined the AHL's Cornwall Aces after being drafted by the Quebec Nordiques (127th overall) in the 1990 NHL Entry Draft. The Aces then moved their team to Halifax in 1994 under the name Halifax Citadels. Norris appeared in 20 National Hockey League regular season games for the Nordiques and the Mighty Ducks of Anaheim, scoring 2 goals and 4 assists for 6 points and collecting 8 penalty minutes.

In 1996 Norris moved to Germany and joined the Kölner Haie (Cologne Sharks) of the Deutsche Eishockey Liga. In 2002, he won the German Championship with Köln when they beat perennial rivals Adler Mannheim 3–2 in the best-of-five final series with Norris netting the game winner in each of Colognes victories. Before the 2003/04 season he signed with league rivals Frankfurt Lions and immediately helped the Lions win the league title in his first season in Frankfurt. There Norris played until 2007, when he finished his playing career.

Norris's most memorable moment may have occurred during the 1990 Junior World Hockey Tournament in Helsinki when he scored the winning goal to help Team Canada beat Czechoslovakia and win the gold medal. He won a silver medal in 1994 with Team Canada at the Lillehammer Winter Olympics.

Coach and managerial career 
 General Manager on the Frankfurt Lions (2007—2010).
 Assistant coach on the Oakland Jr. Grizzlies U16 (2017—2018).

In 2007 Norris retired from active play and, in a surprise move by his last club, was hired as the Lions' general manager in 2007, a position he held until the team filed for bankruptcy in May 2010.

He then became the hockey director of an elite youth hockey program in Michigan, the Oakland Junior Grizzlies. He currently coaches the Bantam Major and PeeWee Major Grizzly AAA hockey teams.

Family 
Norris and his wife Traci have three sons, Joshua, Coale and Dalton. All three have been involved in the Oakland Junior Grizzlies AAA program. Son Josh Norris was a first-round selection of the San Jose Sharks in the 2017 NHL Entry Draft and is currently a player for the Ottawa Senators. His younger brother Warren Norris played professionally with the St. John's Maple Leafs and Grand Rapids Griffins.

Career statistics

Regular season and playoffs

International

The source:

Awards and honours
The source:

References

External links

 
 Dwayne Norris (team staff) at EliteProspects.com 

1970 births
Living people
Baltimore Bandits players
Canadian ice hockey right wingers
Cornwall Aces players
Frankfurt Lions players
Halifax Citadels players
Ice hockey people from Newfoundland and Labrador
Ice hockey players at the 1994 Winter Olympics
Los Angeles Ice Dogs players
Kölner Haie players
Medalists at the 1994 Winter Olympics
Michigan State Spartans men's ice hockey players
Mighty Ducks of Anaheim players
Notre Dame Hounds players
Olympic ice hockey players of Canada
Olympic medalists in ice hockey
Olympic silver medalists for Canada
Quebec Nordiques draft picks
Quebec Nordiques players
Sportspeople from St. John's, Newfoundland and Labrador
Canadian expatriate ice hockey players in Germany
AHCA Division I men's ice hockey All-Americans
Canadian expatriate ice hockey players in the United States